Kameliya Vladimirova Veskova (born 10 January 1971), better known mononymously as Kamelia, is a Bulgarian singer, actress and TV presenter.

Early years

Kamelia was born on 10 January 1971 in the town of Chiprovtsi. Her musical debut was at the age of 11, as a soloist in the school choir with which she performed a Russian song. She appeared in public for the first time, becoming the winner of the Miss Chiprovtsi and Miss Montana beauty pageants organized around that time. At the same time, Kamelia took her first steps as a singer. She started singing at weddings and baptisms in Northwestern Bulgaria as a soloist in a band led by Plamen Velinov. In the spring of 1996, Kamelia was noticed by the conductor of the Vidin Orchestra, Veni Petkov, and became part of the orchestra.

Musical career

1997–1999

Kamelia was seriously involved in singing from the start of 1997. In August of that year, she signed a contract with the music company Payner in Dimitrovgrad. Her popularity was growing significantly, and performances in clubs and discothèques were becoming an integral part of her daily life. In 1998, preparation for her debut album was completed and, in September, the album  was released on the music market. She made videos for the songs "", "", "", "", "" and "". The hit "" from the album was a great success. The song was declared #1 by Payner and New Folk magazine in 1999. The album  reached a circulation of 90,000 copies. These professional successes motivated Kamelia to make an even better album. On 7 December 1999, the album  appeared on the music market. The first song was "", better known as "Ya habibi". The song occupied the top places in all charts. The album sold in record numbers.

2000–2004

At the beginning of 2000, videos promoted some of the biggest hits of her career, "" and "" (the first black-and-white video in pop-folk). On her birthday, the singer was promoting her latest album, which took place in the  complex near Harmanli. In April 2000, Payner and the Bulgarian Association of Music Producers (BAMP) certified  gold for sales. Its total circulation reached 200,000 copies. 30,000 of them are on CD and this makes it the best-selling for the year in the country, and at the end of the year, it even reached platinum circulation.

Kamelia recorded the song "", which appeared on the music market in the summer of 2001 and became a hit. It was also the first music video to be broadcast on Planeta TV. At the end of the year, the singer also participated in the 3-year-old Mustang festival in Varna. She won three awards for "". The singer also presented herself in the competition for a singer with the first recorded song for her upcoming album: the ballad "".

On 21 April 2002, Kamelia's third album, was massively promoted by Payner. The album has a record speed of sales: in the first week alone more than 10,000 copies sold. The hit became a folk emblem for 2002, remaining for a long time atop all music charts. Kamelia said, "I'm really proud of '' because this song turned out to be the biggest hit of the year." The album's third hit was the duet ballad "", in which Kamelia sings in Greek with Greek singer Sakis Coucos. "" stayed in first place in the viewers' chart of Planeta TV for six weeks. While filming the video for the song in Thessaloniki, a Greek TV journalist called Kamelia the "Bulgarian Anna Vissi". On 17 November, Kamelia sang in the Oval Hall, London. She turned out to be the most popular singer in a survey conducted among Bulgarian emigrants in the British capital. So many people wanted to see Kamelia live that about 400 people remained outside the hall. 2002 was the most successful in Kamelia's career. In it end, it was clear that  was the best-selling music product in Bulgaria for the year, regardless of style or company.

On 14 February 2004, the album  appeared on the music market. On 10 February, Kamelia was a guest on a Planeta TV show, where she appeared with her red hair. There, she repeatedly hinted that she had participated in a swimsuit photoshoot for Playboy and thus reinforced rumours that she would appear in the next issue of the magazine. For the first time in Bulgaria, a national tour with the participation of pop-folk performers has been launched.

2005–2012 

On 29 June 2005, after a long wait, Kamelia's fourth solo album  was released. It includes the folk song "". Advertising for the album started on the day of its release. Short excerpts from the songs "", "", "" and "" indicated the potential of the songs on the album. The lead single was "". At the beginning of the summer, the video for the song "" appeared. Following this was a video for "", which appeared on Planeta TV on 19 January 2006.

In February 2007, Kamelia recorded the song and video "". At the annual awards of Planeta TV in February, she appeared in a dress in the colors of the Bulgarian tricolor. In August, the singer presented the video "" and starred in a TV commercial for Polar Bear vodka. At the end of 2007, she traveled to the United States where she toured for two months, mostly in cities with a large concentration of Bulgarian immigrants.

In the summer of 2008, Kamelia was part of the fifth national tour Planeta Derby 2008, and in September she became the first Bulgarian artist with a virtual album, created by her fans. At the beginning of October, the video for the song "" was aired on Planeta TV. She marked the end of 2008 with a music tour in Macedonia, where she made several club appearances.

In February 2009, the video for the song "Orgasm" was shot. Shortly thereafter she received an offer to become the host of fun-humor show , on Nova TV which is similar to the reality TV show Big Brother. On 23 June 2009, Planeta TV promoted Kamelia's video for the song "", and on 30 October promoted the video for the song "".

In early February 2010, Kamelia made the video for the song "". In early August 2010, Slava magazine named Kamelia the sexiest Bulgarian star in its poll. There followed a video for the song "Sexy", a sort of sequel to "Orgasm". On 28 September of the same year, the song "" was released. In October, the singer took part in BNT's Christmas campaign in support of the children of the killed police officers, where she is the face of the campaign along with TV presenters Spas Kyosev, Tsvetanka Rizova and Konstantin Lungov, as well as an actor Vladimir Karamazov.

In early 2011 the video for the song "Erotica" was broadcast on Kamelia's birthday. In February 2011, readers of the  magazine described Kamelia as the sexiest blonde in pop-folk. Apart from Payner, the television operator Bulsatcom promoted a separate 50,000th edition of the Project 13 album on its distribution network for two months. After the album there came a video of Kamelia performing song "".

2012–present 

In March 2012, at the annual music awards on Planeta Kamelia TV, Kamelia received a special award for 15 years of musical career from the company and presented the song "". In the same year, she became the host of the Miss Bulgaria contest together with the actor Kiril Efremov. In the autumn of 2013, Kamelia was again in the role of a TV presenter. The show she hosted was called  and was broadcast on Nova TV.

On 31 March 2014, Kamelia's video for the song "" premiered. This was followed by the duet song "" by Galin and Kamelia, which premiered on 5 September 2014. On 27 October 2014, the singer left Payner for good. Since then, Kamelia has been presenting herself through her own music company: Kams Production OOD. The first song with a video that she presented in 2015 was "". On 17 September, her song "" appeared. On Christmas Day 2015, Kamelia presented her third song of the year, called "", for which a video had been made.

On 5 August 2016, Kamelia released the song "", which became one of the most successful pop-folk songs in the summer of 2016 with over one million views on video-sharing sites. On 23 November 2016, it was announced that Kamelia would be a mentor in the new season of The Voice of Bulgaria in the spring of 2017.

On 8 February 2017, Kamelia's song titled "" was released, with Alek. On 18 July 2017, Kamelia's song titled "" was released, which is a duet with Gamzata and became one of the hits of the year. On 7 December 2017, the song "" was released. Almost a year later, on 23 September 2018, her duet with Sasho Roman "" was released, and became a hit that has about 10 million views. Six months later she remixed the song. On 28 September, the sequel to "" is about to be released, again with Sasho Roman, named "".

Advertisements 

In September 2005 she appeared in a TV commercial for the diet coffee 'Vita gold'.
In September 2006, she was in a TV commercial for the energy drink Tantra.

Discography

Studio albums
 (1998)
 (1999)
 (2002)
 (2005)
Erotica (2010)

Compilations 
 + Best Collection (2006)
Project 13 (2010)
 (2012)

Singles 
"" (2001)
"" (2004)

Video albums 
Best Video Selection (2005)

References

1971 births
Living people
Bulgarian folk-pop singers
Bulgarian television presenters
Bulgarian women television presenters